The 2003 Nigerian Senate election in Borno State was held on April 12, 2003, to elect members of the Nigerian Senate to represent Borno State. Mohammed Daggash representing Borno North and Mohammed Abba Aji representing Borno Central won on the platform of All Nigeria Peoples Party, while Omar Hambagda representing Borno South won on the platform of the Peoples Democratic Party.

Overview

Summary

Results

Borno North 
The election was won by Mohammed Daggash of the All Nigeria Peoples Party.

Borno Central 
The election was won by Mohammed Abba Aji of the All Nigeria Peoples Party.

Borno South 
The election was won by Omar Hambagda of the Peoples Democratic Party.

References 

April 2003 events in Nigeria
Borno State Senate elections
Bor